Lavassaare Wetland Complex is a wetland complex in Pärnu County, Estonia. This complex is one of the biggest wetland massive in Estonia.

The area of the complex is 37,800 ha.

References

Pärnu County
Bogs of Estonia